William, Willy, Will, Billy, or Bill Campbell may refer to:

Government officials
 Lord William Campbell (c. 1731 – 1778), Scottish-born royal governor of Nova Scotia and South Carolina
 William Campbell (British Army officer, died 1796) (died 1796), governor of Bermuda in 1796
 William Campbell, 2nd Baron Stratheden and Campbell (1824–1893), British peer and Liberal politician
 William John Campbell, Creole mayor of Freetown, Sierra Leone
 William Robert Campbell (fl. 1860s), British colonial Inspector General of Police of Ceylon (Sri Lanka)
 William Campbell, Lord Skerrington (1855–1927), Scottish law lord
 William Campbell (MP), British Army officer and politician, MP for Glasgow
 William Telfer Campbell, British colonial administrator

Canada
 William Campbell (judge) (1758–1834), Scottish-born Chief Justice of the Supreme Court of Upper Canada
 William Campbell (Canadian politician) (born 1929), Canadian House of Commons, 1979–1980
 William Campbell (Prince Edward Island politician) (1836–1909), farmer and political figure
 William A. Campbell (politician) (1873–1934), Alberta provincial politician
 William Bennett Campbell (1943–2008), premier of Prince Edward Island
 Bill Campbell (Nova Scotia politician) (1919–2003), Canadian politician in the Nova Scotia House of Assembly
 William Neil Campbell (1885–1979), Canadian politician

United States
 William Campbell (California politician) (1935–2015), state legislator in California
 William Campbell (surveyor) (c. 1767 – 1844), American physician and politician from New York, of Cherry Valley, Otsego County
 William B. Campbell (1807–1867), governor of Tennessee
 William J. Campbell (Illinois politician) (1850–1896), American politician (23rd Lieutenant Governor of Illinois)
 William Joseph Campbell (1905–1988), U.S. federal judge
 William Joseph Campbell (meteorologist) (1930–1992), American meteorologist
 William L. Campbell Jr. (born 1969), U.S. federal judge
 William W. Campbell (New York congressman) (1806–1881), U.S. congressman from New York
 William W. Campbell (New York state senator) (1870–1934), American lawyer and politician from New York
 William Wildman Campbell (1853–1927), U.S. Representative from Ohio
 Bill Campbell (California politician) (born 1942), Republican politician from California
 Bill Campbell (mayor) (born 1953), former mayor of Atlanta, Georgia
 William Douglas Campbell, lobbyist and FBI informant in 2017

Australia
 William Campbell (Victorian politician) (1810–1896), pastoralist and member of the Victorian Legislative Council
 William Campbell (New South Wales politician) (1838–1906), New South Wales politician
 William Henry Campbell (Queensland politician) (1846–1919), Queensland politician and newspaper editor/proprietor
 Bill Campbell (Victorian politician) (1920–1996), Victorian politician

Sports

Association football
 William Campbell (footballer) (1865–?), Scottish forward with various clubs including Preston North End, Darwen and Newton Heath
 Willie Campbell (footballer) (c. 1900–?), Scottish footballer
 Billy Campbell (footballer, born 1920) (1920–1994), Scotland international footballer (Greenock Morton FC)
 Billy Campbell (Northern Irish footballer) (born 1944), Northern Ireland international footballer (Sunderland AFC, Dundee FC, Motherwell FC)
 William Cole Campbell (born 2006), Icelandic footballer (FH, Breiðablik, Borussia Dortmund)

Australian rules football
 Bill Campbell (footballer, born 1883) (1883–1954), Australian rules footballer for Fitzroy
 Bill Campbell (footballer, born 1904) (1904–2007), Australian rules footballer for North Melbourne

Baseball
 Bill Campbell (baseball) (1948–2023), right-handed pitcher in MLB from 1973 to 1987
 Billy Campbell (baseball) (1873–1957), left-handed pitcher in MLB from 1905 to 1909
 Bullet Campbell (William Henry Campbell, 1896–1968), American Negro leagues pitcher

Golf
 William C. Campbell (golfer) (1923–2013), president of the United States Golf Association
 Willie Campbell (golfer) (1862–1900), Scottish golfer

Gridiron football
 William Campbell (American football) (born 1991), American football offensive guard
 Bill Campbell (gridiron football) (1920–1974), American football player in the United States and Canada

Other sports
 William Campbell (sport shooter) (1919–?), Irish Olympic sport shooter
 William Campbell (rugby union) (born 1961), Australian vascular surgeon and former Wallabies rugby player
 Willie Campbell (hurler) (1918–1978), Irish hurler
 Bill Campbell (sportscaster) (1923–2014), sportscaster in the Philadelphia area
 William Campbell (bowls) (1878–?), Scottish lawn bowler

Military figures
 William Campbell (general) (1745–1781), Virginia militia general in the American Revolution
 William Campbell (Medal of Honor, 1838) (1838–?), American Civil War sailor and Medal of Honor recipient
 William Campbell (Medal of Honor, 1840) (1840–1919), American Civil War soldier and Medal of Honor recipient
 William A. Campbell (Tuskegee Airman) (1917–2012), African American pilot
 William Charles Campbell (1889–1958), World War I fighter pilot
 William Hunter Campbell (1839–1862), Ohio civilian who worked for the Union Army during the American Civil War
 William Pitcairn Campbell (1856–1933), British Army general during World War I
 William J. Campbell (general) (1931–2017), American Air Force general

 William Edward Campbell, better known as William March (1893–1954), American soldier and novelist

Arts and entertainment
 William L. Campbell (1946–2005), film editor of Storm 1987
 William M. Campbell, president of Discovery Networks U.S.
 Bill Campbell (illustrator) (1920–2017), American illustrator for the Hawk Model Company
 Big Bill Campbell (1891–1952), Canadian entertainer and broadcaster
 William Wilfred Campbell (1858–1918), Canadian poet

Actors
 William Campbell (actor) (1923–2011), American film and television actor
 Billy Gilbert (silent film actor) (William V. Campbell, 1891–1961), American silent film actor
 Billy Campbell (born 1959), American actor sometimes referred to as William Oliver Campbell or Bill Campbell

Musicians
 Junior Campbell (William Campbell, born 1947), musician and composer
 William Campbell (Scottish musician) (fl 1990s), Scottish musician

Producers and directors
 Billy Campbell (TV executive) (born 1959), American TV producer
 William Campbell (filmmaker), producer, documentary filmmaker, and photojournalist
 William S. Campbell (director) (1884–1972)

Religious figures
 William Howard Campbell (1859–1910), Irish missionary in southern India
 William Campbell (missionary) (1841–1921), Presbyterian missionary to Taiwan
 William Rickarby Campbell (1840–1918), New Zealand Presbyterian minister
 Will Campbell (Baptist minister) (1924–2013), American Baptist minister

Scientists and engineers
 William Campbell (metallographer) (1876–1936), English metallurgist
 William C. Campbell (scientist) (born 1930), Irish biochemist and a Nobel laureate
 William Wallace Campbell (1862–1938), American astronomer

Business and economics
 William Campbell of Tullichewan (1793–1864), Glasgow businessman and councillor
 William Campbell (business executive) (1940–2016), CEO of Intuit
 William Middleton Campbell (1849–1919), Governor of the Bank of England

Other people
 Bill Ransom Campbell (1920–1996), academic architect from North Carolina
 William D. Campbell (Scouting) (1907–1995), world Scouting leader
 William Henry Campbell (college president) (1808–1890), President of Rutgers College, 1862–1882
 William Campbell, Paul McCartney lookalike; according to urban legend took McCartney's place in the Beatles, see Paul is dead